Emarina "Lena" Manuel  (née Rōpata; 21 August 1915 – 16 August 1996) was a New Zealand typist, teacher, Māori welfare officer and community leader. Of Māori descent, Manuel identified with the Ngāti Kahungunu iwi. She was born in Wairoa, New Zealand, on 21 August 1915.

Manuel attended Hukarere Native School for Girls.

In the 1983 New Year Honours, Manuel was appointed a Member of the Order of the British Empire, for services to the Māori people. In the 1991 Queen's Birthday Honours, she was made a Companion of the Queen's Service Order for community service.

References

1915 births
1996 deaths
New Zealand schoolteachers
People from Wairoa
Ngāti Kahungunu people
New Zealand Māori public servants
Companions of the Queen's Service Order
New Zealand Members of the Order of the British Empire
People educated at Hukarere Girls' College